Stunlock Studios is a Swedish video game developer based in Skövde founded in 2010. The company is best known for the Battlerite series, which was released in November 2017, and V Rising, released as an early access game in May 2022. In 2019 the Chinese company Tencent bought a 31 percent share of Stunlock Studios, and later became a majority owner in 2021.

Games developed

References 

Companies based in Västra Götaland County
Skövde
Swedish companies established in 2010
Video game companies established in 2010
Video game companies of Sweden
Video game development companies